Rayko Strahilov Raytchev (born 29 March 1955) is the Permanent Representative to the United Nations for Bulgaria.  He took office September 2007.  He is married and has one daughter.

Education
Raytchev holds a master's degree in international relations from the Higher Institute of Economics in Sofia, Bulgaria.  Also, training in specialization and project formulation and execution at the United Nations Population Fund (UNFPA) Secretariat; a certificate in peacekeeping negotiations and mediation from the Pearson Peacekeeping Centre in Canada; and certification in managing political and economic change from Harvard University’s John F. Kennedy School of Government.

Career
Raytchev was Chief of the Cabinet of the Minister of Foreign Affairs of Bulgaria, prior to his taking office at the United Nations.  He has served as the head of the Arms Control and International Security and Global Security and Disarmament departments in the Foreign Ministry’s North Atlantic Treaty Organization (NATO) and International Security Directorate. Other postings held, include Deputy Permanent Representative to the United Nations in New York City; United Nations Department within the Coordination and Planning Directorate; and United Nations and General Issues Department.

See also
List of current Permanent Representatives to the United Nations

References

United Nation Press Release Presentation of Credentials-Raytchev

1955 births
Living people
Bulgarian diplomats
Harvard Kennedy School alumni
Permanent Representatives of Bulgaria to the United Nations